Heliconius ricini, the ricini longwing, is a butterfly of the family Nymphalidae. It was described by Carl Linnaeus in 1758. It is found from Venezuela and Trinidad to the Guianas and northern Brazil. The habitat consists of savanna-type areas.

Adults have black wings with yellow forewing bands and a broad transverse red stripe on the hindwing.

The larvae feed on Passiflora species from the subgenus Granadilla. Full-grown larvae have a yellow body with black spots and a black head and reach a length of about 8 mm.

Subspecies
Heliconius ricini ricini (northern South America)
Heliconius ricini insulanus (Stichel, 1909) (Trinidad)

References

External links 
 Heliconius ricini at Heliconius Butterflies

ricini
Papilionidae of South America
Butterflies of Trinidad and Tobago
Lepidoptera of Brazil
Lepidoptera of French Guiana
Lepidoptera of Venezuela
Fauna of the Amazon
Butterflies described in 1758
Taxa named by Carl Linnaeus